Amelie Berger (born 22 July 1999) is a German handball player for Borussia Dortmund and the German national team.

She participated at the 2018 European Women's Handball Championship.

References

External links

1999 births
Living people
German female handball players
Sportspeople from Tübingen